The 2009–10 Rose Bowl series was held in Australia from 10 February to 23 February 2010 in which included five Women's One Day International matches were played in Adelaide and Melbourne. In addition, three Women's Twenty20 International were contested. Australia Women won the WODI series by 5–0 and New Zealand Women won the WT20I series by 3–0.

And also held in New Zealand from 26 February to 7 March 2010 in which included three Women's One Day International matches and in addition two Women's Twenty20 International matches were contested. New Zealand Women won the T20I series by 2–0 and Australia Women won the WODI series by 3–0.

New Zealand in Australia

WODI series

1st WODI

2nd WODI

3rd WODI

4th WODI

5th WODI

WT20I series

1st WT20I

2nd WT20I

3rd WT20I

Australia in New Zealand

WT20I series

1st WT20I

2nd WT20I

WODI series

1st WODI

2nd WODI

3rd WODI

References

External links
 Series home at ESPN Cricinfo
 Series home at ESPN Cricinfo

2009–10 Australian women's cricket season
2010 in New Zealand cricket
2010 in women's cricket
Australia women's national cricket team matches
New Zealand women's national cricket team matches
International women's cricket competitions in Australia
Women's One Day International cricket competitions
International cricket competitions in 2009–10